A platform supply vessel (PSV) is a ship specially designed to supply offshore oil and gas platforms. The primary function for most of these vessels is logistic support and transportation of goods, tools, equipment and personnel to and from offshore oil platforms and other offshore structures. In recent years, a new generation of platform supply vessels entered the market, usually equipped with Class 1 or Class 2 dynamic positioning system. 

They belong to the broad category of offshore vessels (OSVs) that include platform supply vessels (PSVs), crane vessels (CV) and well stimulation vessels (WSVs), anchor handling tug supply vessels (AHTSVs) and offshore construction vessels (OCVs). Larger offshore vessels have extensive sophisticated equipment including remotely operated underwater vehicles (ROVs) and tend to accommodate a larger number of people (more than 100).

Capabilities

Cargo

A primary function of a platform supply vessel is to transport supplies to the oil platform and return other cargoes to shore.  Cargo tanks for drilling mud, pulverized cement, diesel fuel, potable and non-potable water, and chemicals used in the drilling process comprise the bulk of the cargo spaces. Fuel, water, and chemicals are almost always required by oil platforms.  Certain other chemicals must be returned to shore for proper recycling or disposal, however, crude oil product from the rig is usually not a supply vessel cargo.

Support
Common and specialty tools are carried on the large decks of these vessels.  Most carry a combination of deck cargoes and bulk cargo in tanks below deck. Many ships are constructed (or re-fitted) to accomplish a particular job. Some of these vessels are equipped with a firefighting capability and fire monitors for fighting platform fires. Some vessels are equipped with oil containment and recovery equipment to assist in the cleanup of a spill at sea.  Other vessels are equipped with tools, chemicals and personnel to "work-over" existing oil wells for the purpose of increasing the wells' production.

Vessel types

 Platform supply vessels (PSV): High capacity supply ship, either in deck or cargo hold.
 Anchor handling tugs supply (AHTS): Similar to PSV, they can anchor and tow floating oil platforms (jack-ups and semi-submersible ones)
 Multi purpose supply vessels (MPSV): Universal vessels able to provide a large variety of maintenance services. They are most of the time equipped with a high capacity crane (100 tons and more). "Jumpers", particular MPSV who are equipped with ROV (remote operated vehicles) to upkeep submarine equipment like wellheads.
 Fast Supply Intervention Vessels (FSIV): High-speed ships, (approximately ) with a smaller deck capacity. They can nevertheless transport passengers. They essentially serve for urgent delivery or small shipment.
 Crew Boats: Those vessels are meant to shuttle back and forth oil platform workers between the sea installation and land. They can be high-speed craft (NGV). Smaller vessels are used for cross-sites transports. The helicopter is also widely used, especially when the weather is tough like in North Sea.
 Stand-by/Rescue vessels: Ships destined to security, they keep patrolling around the installation and must be ready to intervene in case of sea fall, evacuation or fire fighting. They are used mostly in northern seas.
 Line Handling Vessels (LH): Vessels used for handling spies (mooring lines).
 ROV Support Vessels (RSV): Support vessel specialized in ROV (Remote Operate Vehicle) operation.
 Tug Supply Vessels (TS): Vessels used as a tug and in the supply of platforms.
 Oil Spill Response Vessels (OSRV): Vessels dedicated to responding to offshore oil spills.
 Diving Support Vessels (DSV): Vessels used as a floating base for professional diving services.

Vessel crews

Crew on these ships can number up to 36 crew members, depending on the size, working area, and whether DP equipped or not. Crane vessels and drill ships often have 100 to 200 people on board including a dedicated project team.

Daily operations
Crews sign on to work and live aboard the ship an extended period of time, this is followed by similar period of time off. Depending on the ship's owner or operator the time aboard varies from 1 to 3 months with 1 month off. Work details on platform supply vessels, like many ships, are organized into shifts of up to 12 hours.

Living aboard the ship, each crew member and worker will have at least a 12-hour shift, lasting some portion of a 24-hour day. Supply vessels are provided with a "bridge" area for navigating and operating the ship, machinery spaces, living quarters, and galley and mess room. Some have built-in work areas and common areas for entertainment. The large main deck area is sometimes utilized for portable housing.

Living quarters consist of cabins, lockers, offices, and spaces for storing personal items. Living areas are provided with wash basins, showers, and toilets.

The galley or cooking and eating areas aboard ship will be stocked with enough grocery items to last for the intended voyage but with the ability also to store provisions for months if required. A walk-in size cooler and freezer, a commercial stove and oven, deep sinks, storage and counter space will be available for the persons doing the cooking. The eating area will have coffee makers, toasters, microwave ovens, cafeteria-style seating, and other amenities needed to feed a hard-working crew.

See also
 Anchor handling tug supply vessel
 —the first PSV of modern style
 Yacht support vessel

References

External links 
 

Offshore engineering
Oil platforms
Petroleum production
Ship types